The Library Network of Western Switzerland (RERO) was founded by several major libraries in 1985, in the French-speaking region of Romandy in western Switzerland. RERO is a syllabic abbreviation of "Réseau Romand" ("Romand Network").

Until 2020, RERO used to include most of the cantonal, academic, public, and specialized libraries in Switzerland, including the library academic universities in Western Switzerland, including Geneva, Fribourg, and Neuchâtel. In 2020, however, two-thirds of the institutions taking part to RERO moved to the competing network Swisscovery, which spans all of Switzerland and includes the majority of its academic institutions.

References

External links 
 
 VIAF partner page

1985 establishments in Switzerland
Buildings and structures in Valais
English-language websites
French-language websites
German-language websites
Libraries established in 1985
Libraries in Switzerland
Library cataloging and classification
Universities of Applied Sciences in Switzerland
University of Fribourg
University of Geneva
University of Neuchâtel